Stancho Vasilev Bonchev (1 May 1942-2013) was a Bulgarian football goalkeeper. He is legendary player of Lokomotiv Plovdiv and holds the record for the goalkeeper with the most First League appearances - 359 in total (331 league appearances for Lokomotiv Plovdiv and 28 for CSKA Sofia). Stancho Bonchev is also "best footballer of Plovdiv"  for 1965 and "Master of Sports" since 1978.

Bonchev played for the Bulgaria national football team in the UEFA Euro 1968 qualifying rounds.

Honours
CSKA Sofia
Champion of Bulgaria: 1968-69
Bulgarian Cup Winner: 1968-69

References

1942 births
2013 deaths
Bulgarian footballers
Association football goalkeepers
OFC Sliven 2000 players
PFC Lokomotiv Plovdiv players
PFC CSKA Sofia players
First Professional Football League (Bulgaria) players
Bulgarian football managers
PFC Lokomotiv Plovdiv managers